Milan Svojić (Serbian Cyrillic: Милан Својић; born 9 October 1985) is a Serbian footballer.

References

External links
 

1985 births
Living people
Sportspeople from Užice
Serbian footballers
Serbian expatriate footballers
FK Radnički 1923 players
FK Metalac Gornji Milanovac players
FK Mladi Radnik players
FK Sloboda Užice players
FK Sevojno players
FK Horizont Turnovo players
FK Novi Pazar players
Enosis Neon Paralimni FC players
AEL Kalloni F.C. players
Shan United F.C. players
Víkingur Gøta players
ÍF Fuglafjørður players
Serbian SuperLiga players
Cypriot First Division players
Myanmar National League players
Macedonian First Football League players
Faroe Islands Premier League players
Association football midfielders
Serbian expatriate sportspeople in Cyprus
Serbian expatriate sportspeople in North Macedonia
Serbian expatriate sportspeople in Greece
Serbian expatriate sportspeople in the Faroe Islands
Expatriate footballers in Cyprus
Expatriate footballers in North Macedonia
Expatriate footballers in Greece
Expatriate footballers in Myanmar
Expatriate footballers in the Faroe Islands